David Pipe or Pipes may refer to:

 David W. Pipes, Jr. (1886–1968), lawyer and sugar planter
 David Pipes (cricketer) (born 1977), English cricketer
David Pipe (born 1983), Welsh international footballer
David Pipe (racehorse trainer)